Pyanda is a rural locality (a village) in Bereznikovskoye Rural Settlement of Vinogradovsky District, Arkhangelsk Oblast, Russia. The population is 103 as of 2010.

Geography 
It is located on the Severnaya Dvina River.

References

Rural localities in Vinogradovsky District